The Trace Family Trio was a traditional country gospel music group active from 1945 to 1962. The group consisted of Sylvia Trace and her two daughters Darlene and Teena.

Style
The group's style is often compared to the Carter Family, with only a simple guitar accompaniment and occasional piano.

Discography
Earl Sacred Harmony

References

American gospel musical groups
Musical groups established in 1945